Riverdale High School, located in Fort Myers, Florida, United States, is one of the many high schools in Lee County.

The first two years of Riverdale began at the present-day site of Dunbar High School. Riverdale was located in this area for approximately two years while the current site was still in construction. Jack Hogg was the principal for the first two years. In the 1972–1973 school year, the school moved to its present-day location and the principal became Mike Prymas. The current principal is Scott Cook.

Riverdale High School offers the International Baccalaureate program, Advanced Placement, dual enrollment, vocational, honors and general education classes.

In 2019, Riverdale High School had the second highest enrollment of all high schools in the Lee County School District.

Notable alumni 
 Ross Chastain - NASCAR driver, currently competing full-time in the NASCAR Cup Series in the No. 1 car for the Trackhouse Racing Team and winner of the 2022 Texas Grand Prix and 2022 GEICO 500.
 Terrence Cody - nose tackle for the Baltimore Ravens
 Tommy Watkins - former major league baseball player with the Minnesota Twins; Class of 1998
Kyle Waldrop- former Major League Baseball player with the Cincinnati Reds.

Lords of Chaos 

Several Riverdale High students attracted national notoriety as members of a self-styled teen militia called the Lords of Chaos.  They went on a crime spree culminating in the murder of Mark Schwebes, Riverdale High School's band director, on April 30, 1996.

References

External links 
 Official school site

Public high schools in Florida
Magnet schools in Florida
High schools in Lee County, Florida